The News Tribune is an American daily newspaper based in Tacoma, Washington. It is the second-largest daily newspaper in the state of Washington with a weekday circulation of 30,945 in 2020. With origins dating back to 1883, the newspaper was established under its current form in 1918. Locally owned for 73 years by the Baker family, the newspaper was purchased by McClatchy in 1986.

History
The newspaper can trace its origins back to the founding of the weekly Tacoma Ledger by R.F. Radebaugh in 1880 and H.C. Patrick, under the firm name Radebaugh & Company. Radebaugh had served on the reportorial staff of the San Francisco Chronicle. He first visited Tacoma in June 1879. Radebaugh grew to know Patrick, who owned and operated a weekly newspaper in Santa Cruz. Radebaugh and Patrick agreed to move the business to Tacoma. In Tacoma Radebaugh was the paper's editor and Patrick served as the business manager. The paper became a success and Radebaugh bought out Patrick's share. The Ledger served as a morning paper until 1937 and its name remained on the nameplate of The News Tribune and Sunday Ledger until 1979.

. The next year, H.C. Patrick founded The News, another weekly. Both papers became dailies in 1883. In 1898, Radebaugh and Patrick sold their papers to S.A. Perkins. Radebaugh re-entered the market in 1907 with the debut of the Tacoma Tribune. He exited five years later with the sale of the Tribune to Frank S. and Elbert H. Baker. The Bakers then purchased The News and the Tacoma Ledger in 1918, and all three papers were combined into the Tacoma News Tribune and Ledger.

In 1948, the paper began operating the radio stations KTNT-AM and KTNT-FM, and began operating a television station with the same call letters in 1953. In 1972, KTNT-FM's call letters were changed to KNBQ, which became KBSG in 1988, and KIRO-FM in 2008. Two years later, the television station was sold and its call letters changed to KSTW, which is now an owned-and-operated station of The CW.

In 1979, the newspaper adopted the name Tacoma News Tribune. Its parent bought the Pierce County Herald in 1983. In October 1985, Sacramento-based McClatchy Newspapers reached an agreement with the Baker family to purchase the Tribune Publishing Company's newspaper assets from them for an estimated $112 million, with the transaction completed on August 1, 1986; Viacom purchased the remaining assets, including KNBQ, at the same time.

The News Tribune published as The Morning News Tribune from April 6, 1987, to October 4, 1993, when "Morning" was dropped from its name. As of 2001, the News Tribune was the third largest newspaper in Washington, with a daily circulation of 130,000.

The newspaper, alongside sister publication The Olympian, were printed at a plant in Tacoma until February 3, 2019. Since that time, the newspapers have been printed at the facilities of The Columbian in Vancouver, Washington.

Criticism

Harriet Hall criticized the News Tribune in Skeptical Inquirer in 2019 for its acceptance of advertisements for health-related products that imitated the presentation of real articles with only a small disclaimer.

See also

References

External links
 thenewstribune.com - official website
 Official mobile website
 
 Editor and Publisher 1909

Companies based in Tacoma, Washington
McClatchy publications
Mass media in Tacoma, Washington
Newspapers published in Washington (state)
1883 establishments in Washington Territory
Newspapers established in 1883